Aurora Reservoir is a  reservoir located in the far southeastern reach of Aurora, Colorado. Senac Creek and other minor streams flow into the reservoir's three coves, Senac, Marina and Lone Tree, each pointing to the south. The reservoir provides drinking water to the City of Aurora, and is also a recreation area.

History
Aurora Reservoir was built in 1989 at a cost of 41 million dollars and was filled in 1990. The reservoir is used for recreation and to provide water for Aurora, CO and surrounding communities. Miles of undeveloped prairie originally separated the reservoir from the city's neighborhoods, and its location has been referred to as "Aurora's Outback".

Recreation
The rapid Southeastern expansion of the Denver–Aurora Metropolitan Area has greatly increased attendance and awareness of the reservoir. Many recreational opportunities exist at Aurora Reservoir. There is a small swim beach open seasonally, boat dock, rental equipment shack,  jogging/biking trail, designated SCUBA diving beach/area in water, and many opportunities for fishermen. In order to protect the purity of the water, only electric boats are allowed, thus limiting full recreational use of the reservoir. Not surprisingly, it is a popular location for local SCUBA centers to take dive students for their open-water certification. More recently, the reservoir has also become a reputable fishing spot mainly for Trout, Walleye and Catfish, and has truly been in the limelight lately regarding the record for largest catfish caught in Colorado being set at the reservoir in October 2010. The reservoir also hosts a number of community events throughout the year including triathlons, sailing camps, and other local functions.

External links

Aurora Reservoir: Discover Aurora Reservoir
KMGH Denver - Man Catches Record Catfish at Aurora Reservoir

References

Reservoirs in Colorado
Geography of Aurora, Colorado
Protected areas of Arapahoe County, Colorado
Bodies of water of Arapahoe County, Colorado